Botujuru is a train station on CPTM Line 7-Ruby, located in the city of Campo Limpo Paulista.

References

Companhia Paulista de Trens Metropolitanos stations
Railway stations opened in 1908